Luc Dietrich (17 March 1913, Dijon – 12 August 1944) was a French writer.

Dietrich was born in Dijon. His father died when he was very young, and his mother was ill and addicted to drugs. She was frequently incapable of taking care of her son; several times he was sent asylums and similar establishments. Shortly after Dietrich's release from one at the age of 18, his mother died.

In 1932 Dietrich met philosopher and poet Lanza del Vasto at the Parc Monceau in Paris. The first thing del Vasto said to Dietrich was "Are you as good as this bread?" The two became inseparable friends for the rest of Dietrich's short life. Lanza helped and mentored Dietrich in writing, although he always refused to be credited as a co-author. Another of Dietrich's famous friends was poet René Daumal. After becoming lightly wounded during a bombardment in 1944, Dietrich developed hemiplegia and then gangrene, and died the same year, aged 31.

He is best known today for his semi-autobiographical novel, Le Bonheur des tristes ("The Happiness of Sad People").

Works
 Huttes à la lisière, 1930
 The Happiness of Sad People (Le Bonheur des tristes), 1935
 Earth (Terre), 1936
 Apprenticeship of the City (L’Apprentissage de la ville), 1942
 Talk of Friendship (Le Dialogue de l’Amitié), with Lanza del Vasto, 1942
 L'Injuste Grandeur, 1943
 Emblèmes végétaux, 1993
 Demain, c’est le possible, 1996
 Poésies, 1996
 L'École des conquérants, 1997

References
 Delbourg, Patrice. Luc Dietrich, astéroïde lyrique. In: Les désemparés: 53 portraits d'écrivains, edited by Patrice Delbourg. Castor astral, 1996. ,

External links
 

20th-century French non-fiction writers
1913 births
1944 deaths
Writers from Dijon
French photographers
20th-century French male writers
French civilians killed in World War II